Umma (in modern Dhi Qar Province in Iraq, formerly also called Gishban) was an ancient city in Sumer. There is some scholarly debate about the Sumerian and Akkadian names for this site. Traditionally, Umma was identified with Tell Jokha. One or both were the leading city of the Early Dynastic kingdom of Gišša, with the most recent excavators putting forth that Umm al-Aqarib was prominent in EDIII but Jokha rose to preeminence later.

History
In the early Sumerian text Inanna's descent to the netherworld, Inanna dissuades demons from the netherworld from taking Shara, patron of Umma, who was living in squalor. They eventually take Dumuzid king of Uruk instead, who lived in palatial opulence.

Best known for its long frontier conflict with Lagash, as reported circa 2400 BC by Entemena, the city reached its zenith c. 2350 BC, under the rule of Lugal-Zage-Si who also controlled Ur and Uruk. Under the Ur III dynasty, Umma became an important provincial center. Most of the over 30,000 tablets recovered from the site are administrative and economic texts from that time. They permit an excellent insight into affairs in Umma. The Umma calendar of Shulgi (c. 21st century BC) is the immediate predecessor of the later Babylonian calendar, and indirectly of the post-exilic Hebrew calendar. Umma appears to have been abandoned after the Middle Bronze Age.

Archaeology

The site of Tell Jokha was visited by William Loftus in 1854 and John Punnett Peters of the University of Pennsylvania in 1885. In the early 1900s, many illegally excavated Umma tablets from the Third Dynasty of Ur began to appear on the antiquities market. From 1999 to 2002 Jokha was worked by an Iraqi team, recovering a number of tablets and bullae from the Early Dynastic, Sargonic, Ur III, and Old Babylonian periods. In 2017, the Slovak Archaeological and Historical Institute began excavations at Tell Jokha.

The site of Umm al-Aqarib (located at 45.80°E longitude and 31.60°N latitude) covers about 5 square kilometers and is made up of 21 mounds the largest of which is 20 meters above the level of the plain. The location was first visited by John Punnett Peters in the 1800s. It was excavated for a total of 7 seasons in 1999–2002 and 2008–2010 by Iraqi archaeologists under difficult conditions. At Umm al-Aqarib, archaeologists uncovered levels from the Early Dynastic Period (c. 2900–2300 BC), including several monumental buildings, one of them variously identified as a temple or palace.

The site of Tell Shmet also lies nearby, around 10 kilometers to the northwest of Umma and within visual distance of Zabala. It was part of the Umma province. The site measures 990 by 720 meters (712,800 square meters). The main Sargonic and Ur III remains of the site were destroyed by a Ministry of Agriculture program to plant trees so as to prevent sand dunes. In response to looting which began in 1994 the Iraqi State Board of Antiquities and Heritage conducted salvage excavations in 2001 and 2002 under Mohammad Sabri Abdulraheem. All of the paper records of the excavation were lost in looting of residential areas after the 2003 war. Plano-convex bricks and a residential area of the Early Dynastic III and Akkadian periods were uncovered. Finds included 67 clay cuneiform tablets, dozens of cylinder seals, and a number of stone and metal objects. The tablets mostly date ED III with the latest being Ur III. The tablets support the proposal that the ancient name of the site was Ki.anki. They mention the names of the gods Ninazu and Dumuzi-Maru. Only some of the tablets have been published.

Looting

During the 2003 invasion of Iraq, after Coalition bombing began, looters descended upon the site which is now pockmarked with hundreds of ditches and pits. The prospects for future official excavation and research were seriously compromised in the process.

In 2011, Global Heritage Network, which monitors threats to cultural heritage sites in developing nations, released aerial images comparing Umma in 2003 and 2010, showing a landscape devastated by looters' trenches during that time—approximately 1.12 square km in total. Additional images relevant to the situation at Umm al-Aqarib are included in Tucker's article on the destruction of Iraq's archaeological heritage.

Rulers of Umma
Aga of Kish (26th century BC), king of Kish, probably took over Umma, and consequently Zabala, which was dependant of it in the Early Dynastic Period.

First Dynasty of Umma

Second Dynasty of Umma

See also
 Cities of the Ancient Near East

References

Further reading
 B. Alster, Geštinanna as Singer and the Chorus of Uruk and Zabalam: UET 6/1 22, JCS, vol. 37, pp. 219–28, 1985
 Tonia M. Sharlach, Provincial taxation and the Ur III State, Brill, 2003, 
 Trevor Bryce, The Routledge Handbook of The Peoples and Places of Ancient Western Asia: The Near East from the Early Bronze Age to the fall of the Persian Empire, Routledge, 2009
 B. R. Foster, Umma in the Sargonic Period, Memoirs of the Connecticut Academy of Arts and Sciences, vol. 20, Hamden, 1982
 Georges Contenau, Umma sous la Dynastie d'Ur, Librarie Paul Geuthner, 1916
 Jacob L. Dahl, The Ruling Family of Ur III Umma: A Prosopographical Analysis of an Elite Family in Southern Iraq 4000 Years ago, Nederlands Instituut voor het Nabije Oosten/Netherlands Institute for the Near East (NINO), 2007, 
 Shin T. Kang, Sumerian economic texts from the Umma archive, University of Illinois Press, 1973, 
 Rost, Stephanie, and Angelo Di Michele, "Systematic Versus Random Sampling in Approaches to Landscape Archaeology: The Umma Survey Project in Southern Mesopotamia", Journal of Field Archaeology 47.5, pp. 285-304, 2022
 Diana Tucker, "Brutal Destruction of Iraq's Archaeological Sites Continues", online article from September 21, 2009 posted on www.uruknet.info, http://www.uruknet.info/?p=58169
van Driel, G. "The Size of Institutional Umma." Archiv Für Orientforschung, vol. 46/47, 1999, pp. 80–91

External links
 
 Photograph of site looting - Oriental Institute
 The Province of Umma - CDLI
 Brutal Destruction of Iraq's Archaeological Sites Continues

 
Archaeological sites in Iraq
Populated places in Dhi Qar Province
Former populated places in Iraq
Sumerian cities
Former kingdoms